Citron is a species of citrus fruit; citron varieties include:
 Florentine citron
 Diamante citron from Italy
 Greek citron
 Balady citron from Israel
 Fingered citron
 Yemenite citron

Other uses
 Citron (surname)
 Parti Citron, a political party in Canada
 Citron melon
 Citron (color)
 Citron (band), a Czech hard rock/heavy metal band

See also
 Citronella (disambiguation)
 Citroën
 Cintron